The Red Bulls were a professional League of Legends esports team created by Red Bull, which competed in the European League of Legends Challenger Series (EU CS), the second highest level of professional League of Legends in Europe.

History 
On 19 May 2017, Red Bull announced the creation of a professional League of Legends team named "Red Bulls". The team is set to play in the European League of Legends Challenger Series, officially organized by developer Riot Games as the second-highest level of professional League of Legends competition in Europe, with the European League of Legends Championship Series being the highest level. Red Bull announced former Fnatic League of Legends team manager Oliver "IzpAH" Steer as the head coach of the team, Gábor "The Minimalist" Fenyvesi as the general manager, and Raymond "kaSing" Tsang as the team captain.

After having a 12–1 record in the 2017 Summer European Open Qualifiers and 7–1 in the 2017 Summer European Qualifiers, the Red Bulls qualified for the 2017 Summer European League of Legends Challenger Series, where they played against FC Schalke 04, Paris Saint-Germain, Giants Gaming, Origen, and Wind and Rain. The Red Bulls failed to qualify for the EU LCS promotion tournament after losing 1–3 to FC Schalke 04 in playoffs. The team disbanded shortly after.

Former roster

Tournament results

References 

Former League of Legends Challenger Series teams
Red Bull sports teams
Esports teams established in 2017
Esports teams disestablished in 2018